Rascheid is a municipality in the Trier-Saarburg district in Rhineland-Palatinate, Germany. It belongs to the Verbandsgemeinde Hermeskeil and is an officially recognized tourist resort.

Geography
The domiciles Bahnhof Rascheid and Rauschmühle also belong to Rascheid.

History
According to a document dated 980, the village and church belonged to the St. Paulin Abbey in Trier. In the Middle Ages, the town and church belonged to the Neumagen regime, in the fifteenth century to the villagers of Hunolstein, and later to the counts of Sayn-Wittgenstein.

Population Development Statistics
Development of the population of Rascheid, the values from 1871 to 1987 are based on censuses:

Politics

Town Council
The town council in Rascheid consists of eight councilors, who were elected by a majority vote in the municipal elections on 25 May 2014, as well as the village's mayor as chairman. Up to 2014 the municipal council consisted of twelve council members.

Clubs
FCK-Fanclub Zapp-Za-Rapp (Soccer Fanclub FCK)
Förderverein "Rascheider Ringweg" (friends' association "Rascheider Ringweg")
Förderverein Fw. Feuerwehr (friends' association voluntary fire brigade)
Gesangverein Rascheid e.V. 1931 (Choir)
Jugendclub (Youth Club)
Karnevalverein Rascheid (Carnival Club)
Katholische Frauengemeinschaft (catholic female community)
KEB Rascheid (catholic adult education)
Musikverein Rascheid 1928 e. V. (Orchestra)
Sportverein Rascheid 1947 e.V. (Sports Club)

References

Municipalities in Rhineland-Palatinate
Trier-Saarburg